Hashem Adnan (Arabic: هاشم عدنان, born June 20, 1988) is a Kuwaiti footballer who is a midfielder and captains for Al-Yarmouk SC.

Background 
Adnan was born in Kuwait City, Kuwait on June 20, 1988. In 1998, he joined Al-Yarmouk academy and represented all the youth teams before joining Al-Yarmouk SC in 2006. During his career with Al-Yarmouk SC, Adnan participated several competition such as the Kuwait Premier League, Kuwaiti futsal league, Kuwaiti Futsal Super Cup, Kuwaiti Division One, Kuwait Crown Prince Cup and Kuwait Emir Cup.

References 

1988 births
Living people
Kuwaiti footballers
Sportspeople from Kuwait City
Association football midfielders
Kuwait international footballers
Al-Yarmouk SC (Kuwait) players
Kuwait Premier League players